Jerod Mixon (born May 24, 1981) is an American actor, comedian, producer and writer. He is best known for portraying Weensie in Old School. He is the older brother of actor Jamal Mixon. He also produced and starred in the comedy rap film White T.

Career
Mixon distinguished himself as an actor in his role as Shonté Jr. Baileygates, son of Jim Carrey's lead character, in Me, Myself & Irene. Mixon also had a prominent role in the 2002 film The New Guy. He also played a small part in an episode of Scrubs as an obese patient named Herbert in an episode named "My New Suit". He is also best known as the voice of Theo on Maya & Miguel.

External links 
 

1981 births
Living people
21st-century American male actors
African-American male actors
American male child actors
American male film actors
American male television actors
People from Port Hueneme, California
21st-century African-American people
20th-century African-American people